Kishore Dang is an Indian director. He has a long career in TV shows, production and filmmaking. Dang was a member of the Jury of the 53rd National Film Awards organized by the Government of India. Dang has been associated with foreign films such as Gandhi, The Far Pavilions, Kim, Mountbatten: The Last Viceroy, The Deceivers, The Young Indiana Jones Chronicles, In Custody and The Jungle Book.  He has been associated with the Theatre Group “Ank” for four years that was led by Dinesh Thakur. His television shows include Maila Aanchal, Nooriee, Uttarkatha, Humsafar The Train, Detective Karan and Faujji...The Iron Man. He directed documentary film Kab Tak that participated in Mumbai International Film Festival 2012. Other films include Aakhri Dastak - a film made for the Indian Army.

Early life
Dang left home at age 19. He met producer Suresh Jindal (producer of Rajnigandha, Katha and Shatranj Ke Khiladi and other works). He introduced Dang to Charles Torbett who made him the assistant of Tony Teiger (stand-by prop man of Gandhi).

Career

Major work
Dang became a director. He started out by contributing to foreign films. Then, he began producing TV shows. His first, Maila Aanchal, aired on DD National in 1990. He directed many other serials. He acted in a serial, Space City Sigma.
 
Dang also made documentary films. Some of those are: Sugalis/Lambadis, The Yaravas Of Coorg and Kab-Tak. Kab-Tak (35mm Cinemascope Duration 2 Minutes) is a short, competition film, that participated in The Mumbai International Film Festival 2012. Dang directed a short movie called Aakhri Dastak for the Indian Army.

Filmography

TV serials 
 Maila Aanchal
 Abhimaan 
 Station Master 
 The Living Traditions (Jeeti Jaagti Paramparain) 
 Daastan
 Ek Gulab Ka Khoon 
 Humsafar - The Train
 Jehara 
 Subahah 
 Detective Karan
 Detective Jai 
 Karan The Detective
 Faujji...The Iron Man
 Uttar Katha
 Nooriee
 Rukhsana 
 Parag Goswami - The Detective 
 Zara Thehro 
 Praarabdh 
 Maare Gaye Gulfaam
 Bazm-E-Charaghan

Documentaries
 Sugalis / Lambadis 
 The Yaravas Of Coorg
 Fun-Flying
 Showcase India 
 Slum Sanitation

Associated with foreign feature films
 Gandhi Indo British Films Limited, London (UK)
 Bengal Lancers Stephen Weeks Company, (UK)
 Kim London Films International Limited, London (UK)
 Mountbatten: The Last Viceroy George Walker Productions Ltd., Middlesex (UK)
 The Deceivers Merchant Ivory Production (US)
 The Adventures of Young Indiana Jones Worldwide Productions Ltd., California (US)
 The Jungle Book (Live) Baloo Productions Inc., Middlesex (UK)
 The Far Pavilions Geoff Reeve & Associates Ltd., London (UK)
 In Custody Merchant Ivory Productions (US)
 Kasmir Short Cut Films (Germany)
 West Myth Nitrate Films (Germany)
 AT&T Emerald Films, New York (US)

Short films
  Aakhri Dastak a film on HIV/AIDS for Ministry of Defence.
  Kab-Tak a film on child labour for Films Division

Recognition 
 NIFA Award for the Best Show from The Honourable Union Minister of Information & Broadcasting for Maila Aanchal.
 Best TV. Show, Karan The Detective, in 2005 and in 2007, respectively.

References

Indian filmmakers
Living people
Year of birth missing (living people)